Mieczysław Kwiryn Biernacki (March 30, 1891 – November 21, 1959) was a Polish mathematical chemist. He fought in World War I in the French Army and later in the forces of Polish general Józef Haller.

External links
 Author profile in the database zbMATH

References

1891 births
1959 deaths
Scientists from Lublin
Theoretical chemists
Polish chemists
University of Paris alumni
Polish people of World War I
Polish expatriates in France